The Oulu Market Square is the main market square of the city of Oulu, Finland.

The market square is located in the city centre, in the Pokkinen district, on the waterfront of the Oulujoki river. The Rotuaari pedestrian zone starts from the square behind the Toripolliisi statue.

In addition to the traditional market stalls, old barns painted in red color and restored as bars and restaurants are bordering the square nowadays. The historical  Oulu market hall was opened on the square in 1901 mainly to get selling of meat out of the open square.

Gallery

References

External links
 https://visitoulu.fi/en/tuote/kauppatori-market-square-2/ Retrieved 18 April 2020 (Visit oulu website of the market square)

Geography of Oulu
Retail markets in Finland
Tourist attractions in Oulu
Squares in Finland
Pokkinen